The Stockard Channing Show is an American sitcom television series starring Stockard Channing, Ron Silver, Sydney Goldsmith, Max Showalter and Jack Somack.

The show first aired on CBS from March 24 to July 12, 1980, with 13 episodes produced. The series aired at 8:30 P.M. ET, along with WKRP in Cincinnati, M*A*S*H and Flo on the Monday night lineup. After the show ended, Channing would not star in another sitcom until Out of Practice in 2005.

Cast
 Stockard Channing as Susan Goodenow
 Ron Silver as Brad Gabriel
 Sydney Goldsmith as Earline Cunningham
 Max Showalter as Gus Clyde
 Jack Somack as Mr. Kramer
 Bruce Baum as Alf Serenity

Plot
Susan Goodenow (Channing) was a recent divorcee whose ditzy friend/neighbor Earline got her a job working as a consumer reporter for the local Los Angeles TV show The Big Rip-Off.  Headlining the show was Brad Gabriel (Ron Silver) a tightly-wound journalist who was convinced everything was toxic and bad.  Flamboyant Gus Clyde (Max Showalter), a former Broadway entertainer, was the station owner; Alf (Bruce Baum) was a burnout hippie who landed a job as a security guard at the station after the health food store he owned was targeted by The Big Rip-Off; and Mr. Kramer (Jack Somack) was Susan's landlord.  Plots often revolved around Susan's attempts to expose corporations who were swindling consumers, which afforded Channing plenty of opportunities to don various disguises and personas.

Production
After wowing audiences in Grease and The Cheap Detective, CBS sets their sights on making Stockard Channing into a TV star.  Channing and her then-husband, producer David Debin, were offered ownership and creative control of a movie and television series.  The result were the 1979 made-for-TV movie Silent Victory: The Kitty O'Neil Story and series Stockard Channing in Just Friends.  Just Friends was moderately successful and was never officially canceled, but it didn't secure a slot on the fall schedule.

In March 1980, Channing returned in The Stockard Channing Show, which like Just Friends debuted as a mid-season replacement.  "I felt last year I became the workhorse, and had to push the show along," Channing told the Associated Press in 1980. "In doing this season, I didn't feel I desperately had to do anything to keep the show moving."  Although it was a completely different show, there was certainly familiar ground, beginning with the opening theme song (the same on both series).  Stockard's character was again named Susan (Susan was Channing's legal first name; her last name in the series was "Goodenow" as opposed to "Hughes" in the previous) and her apartment was simply redressed. In Just Friends, Susan was in a failing marriage; for this series, she is fully divorced.  Sydney Goldsmith was retained as Susan's flighty friend/neighbor, now renamed Earline.   In addition to the on-screen similarities, many crew members from Just Friends were also retained.

Episodes

DVD release
The complete series was released on DVD in 2006 by the Canadian company Visual Entertainment paired with 10 of the 13 episodes of Channing's previous series, Stockard Channing in Just Friends.   The first episode of The Stockard Channing Show appears at the end of the first disc.

References

External links
 

1980 American television series debuts
1980 American television series endings
1980s American sitcoms
CBS original programming
English-language television shows
Television series by Sony Pictures Television
Television shows set in New York City